Montell Ernest Owens (born May 4, 1984) is a former American football fullback. He played college football at Maine. Owens was signed by the Jacksonville Jaguars as an undrafted free agent in 2006. He has also played for the Detroit Lions and Chicago Bears.

Early years
Owens attended Concord High School in Wilmington, Delaware, and was a letterman in football, baseball, and track. As a student, he was a member of the National Honor Society and toured Europe with American Music Abroad. In football, Owens rushed for 1,100 yards and 20 touchdowns. Owens graduated from Concord High School in 2002.

College career
Owens attended the University of Maine, where he was a four-year letterman who played in 38 games at tailback for the Maine Black Bears football team. In 2005, he established career highs with 184 carries for 779 yards and nine touchdowns as a senior. As a junior in 2004, he played in nine games and had 49 carries for 187 yards and two touchdowns. He played in nine games as a sophomore rushed for 32 yards on 15 carries. Owens majored in kinesiology and biology and minored in jazz performance.

Professional career

Jacksonville Jaguars
After going undrafted in the 2006 NFL Draft, Owens signed with the Jacksonville Jaguars on April 30, 2006. In 2009, he tied the single-season franchise record with 30 special teams tackles. Owens was selected as a first alternate for the 2010 Pro Bowl. He was selected to the 2011 Pro Bowl as a special teams player. In the Pro Bowl game, Owens recovered a fumble by Devin Hester on a kickoff and returned it for a touchdown. In the same game he caught a pass for a touchdown from Matt Cassel. He replaced New England's Matthew Slater as the special teams player on the AFC roster for the 2012 Pro Bowl. He was released on May 16, 2013.

Owens was attributed with the nickname of "Mowens" during his time with the Jaguars, the result of a group of die-hard fans contracting the name listed on his jersey "M. OWENS".

Detroit Lions
Owens was signed by the Detroit Lions on May 30, 2013. On October 31, 2013, he was activated off short-term injured reserve. Owens was placed on injured reserve on September 30, 2014.

Chicago Bears
On December 11, 2014, Owens was signed by the Chicago Bears.

Jaguars franchise records
 Most special teams tackles: 118
 Most special teams tackles in single season: 30 (2009)

References

External links

 Chicago Bears bio
 Detroit Lions bio
 

1984 births
Living people
Players of American football from Wilmington, Delaware
American football fullbacks
American trumpeters
American male trumpeters
Maine Black Bears football players
Jacksonville Jaguars players
Detroit Lions players
Chicago Bears players
21st-century trumpeters
21st-century American male musicians
American Conference Pro Bowl players